Spontaneous emission is the process in which a quantum mechanical system (such as a molecule, an atom or a subatomic particle) transits from an excited energy state to a lower energy state (e.g., its ground state) and emits a quantized amount of energy in the form of a photon. Spontaneous emission is ultimately responsible for most of the light we see all around us; it is so ubiquitous that there are many names given to what is essentially the same process. If atoms (or molecules) are excited by some means other than heating, the spontaneous emission is called luminescence. For example, fireflies are luminescent. And there are different forms of luminescence depending on how excited atoms are produced (electroluminescence, chemiluminescence etc.). If the excitation is affected by the absorption of radiation the spontaneous emission is called fluorescence. Sometimes molecules have a metastable level and continue to fluoresce long after the exciting radiation is turned off; this is called phosphorescence. Figurines that glow in the dark are  phosphorescent. Lasers start via spontaneous emission, then during continuous operation work by stimulated emission.

Spontaneous emission cannot be explained by classical electromagnetic theory and is fundamentally a quantum process. According to the American Physical Society, the first person to correctly predict the phenomenon of spontaneous emission was Albert Einstein in a series of papers starting in 1916, culminating in what is now called the Einstein A Coefficient. Einstein's quantum theory of radiation anticipated ideas later expressed in quantum electrodynamics and quantum optics by several decades. Later, after the formal discovery of quantum mechanics in 1926, the rate of spontaneous emission was accurately described from first principles by Dirac in his quantum theory of radiation, the precursor to the theory which he later called quantum electrodynamics. Contemporary physicists, when asked to give a physical explanation for spontaneous emission, generally invoke the zero-point energy of the electromagnetic field. In 1963, the Jaynes–Cummings model was developed describing the system of a two-level atom interacting with a quantized field mode (i.e. the vacuum) within an optical cavity. It gave the nonintuitive prediction that the rate of spontaneous emission could be controlled depending on the boundary conditions of the surrounding vacuum field. These experiments gave rise to cavity quantum electrodynamics (CQED), the study of effects of mirrors and cavities on radiative corrections.

Introduction
If a light source ('the atom') is in an excited state with energy , it may spontaneously decay to a lower lying level (e.g., the ground state) with energy , releasing the difference in energy between the two states as a photon. The photon will have angular frequency  and an  energy :

where  is the reduced Planck constant. The phase of the photon in spontaneous emission is random as is the direction in which the photon propagates. This is not true for stimulated emission. An energy level diagram illustrating the process of spontaneous emission is shown below:

where  is the rate of spontaneous emission. In the rate-equation  is a proportionality constant for this particular transition in this particular light source. The constant is referred to as the Einstein A coefficient, and has units s. 
The above equation can be solved to give:

The number of excited states  thus decays exponentially with time, similar to radioactive decay. After one lifetime, the number of excited states decays to 36.8% of its original value (-time). The radiative decay rate  is inversely proportional to the lifetime :

Theory
Spontaneous transitions were not explainable within the framework of the Schrödinger equation, in which the electronic energy levels were quantized, but the electromagnetic field was not. Given that the eigenstates of an atom are properly diagonalized, the overlap of the wavefunctions between the excited state and the ground state of the atom is zero. Thus, in the absence of a quantized electromagnetic field, the excited state atom cannot decay to the ground state. In order to explain spontaneous transitions, quantum mechanics must be extended to a quantum field theory, wherein the electromagnetic field is quantized at every point in space. The quantum field theory of electrons and electromagnetic fields is known as quantum electrodynamics.

In quantum electrodynamics (or QED), the electromagnetic field has a ground state, the QED vacuum, which can mix with the excited stationary states of the atom. As a result of this interaction, the "stationary state" of the atom is no longer a true eigenstate of the combined system of the atom plus electromagnetic field. In particular, the electron transition from the excited state to the electronic ground state mixes with the transition of the electromagnetic field from the ground state to an excited state, a field state with one photon in it. Spontaneous emission in free space depends upon vacuum fluctuations to get started.

Although there is only one electronic transition from the excited state to ground state, there are many ways in which the electromagnetic field may go from the ground state to a one-photon state. That is, the electromagnetic field has infinitely more degrees of freedom, corresponding to the different directions in which the photon can be emitted.  Equivalently, one might say that the phase space offered by the electromagnetic field is infinitely larger than that offered by the atom. This infinite degree of freedom for the emission of the photon results in the apparent irreversible decay, i.e., spontaneous emission.

In the presence of electromagnetic vacuum modes, the combined atom-vacuum system is explained by  the superposition of the wavefunctions of the excited state atom with no photon and the ground state atom with a single emitted photon:

As mentioned above, the emitted photon has a chance to be emitted with different wavenumbers and polarizations, and the resulting wavefunction is a superposition of these possibilities. To calculate the probability of the atom at the ground state, one needs to solve the time evolution of the wavefunction with an appropriate Hamiltonian. To solve for the transition amplitude, one needs to average over (integrate over) all the vacuum modes, since one must consider the probabilities that the emitted photon occupies various parts of phase space equally. The "spontaneously" emitted photon has infinite different modes to propagate into, thus the probability of the atom re-absorbing the photon and returning to the original state is negligible, making the atomic decay practically irreversible. Such irreversible time evolution of the atom-vacuum system is responsible for the apparent spontaneous decay of an excited atom. If one were to keep track of all the vacuum modes, the combined atom-vacuum system would undergo unitary time evolution, making the decay process reversible. Cavity quantum electrodynamics is one such system where the vacuum modes are modified resulting in the reversible decay process, see also Quantum revival. The theory of the spontaneous emission under the QED framework was first calculated by Weisskopf and Wigner.

Rate of spontaneous emission
The rate of spontaneous emission (i.e., the radiative rate) can be described by Fermi's golden rule. The rate of emission depends on two factors: an 'atomic part', which describes
the internal structure of the light source and a 'field part', which describes the density of electromagnetic modes of the environment. The atomic part describes the strength of a transition between two states in terms of transition moments. In a homogeneous medium, such as free space, the rate of spontaneous emission in the dipole approximation is given by:

The expression  stands for the definition of the transition dipole moment  for dipole moment operator , where  is the elementary charge and  stands for position operator. (This approximation breaks down in the case of inner shell electrons in high-Z atoms.)

In contrast with atoms, which have a discrete emission spectrum, quantum dots can be tuned continuously by changing their size. This property has been used to check the -frequency dependence of the spontaneous emission rate as described by Fermi's golden rule.

Radiative and nonradiative decay: the quantum efficiency
In the rate-equation above, it is assumed that decay of the number of excited states  only occurs under emission of light. In this case one speaks of full radiative decay and this means that the quantum efficiency is 100%. Besides radiative decay, which occurs under the emission of light, there is a second decay mechanism; nonradiative decay. To determine the total decay rate , radiative and nonradiative rates should be summed:

where  is the total decay rate,  is the radiative decay rate and  the nonradiative decay rate. The quantum efficiency (QE) is defined as the fraction of emission processes in which emission of light is involved:

In nonradiative relaxation, the energy is released as phonons, more commonly known as heat. Nonradiative relaxation occurs when the energy difference between the levels is very small, and these typically occur on a much faster time scale than radiative transitions.  For many materials (for instance, semiconductors), electrons move quickly from a high energy level to a meta-stable level via small nonradiative transitions and then make the final move down to the bottom level via an optical or radiative transition. This final transition is the transition over the bandgap in semiconductors.  Large nonradiative transitions do not occur frequently because the crystal structure generally cannot support large vibrations without destroying bonds (which generally doesn't happen for relaxation). Meta-stable states form a very important feature that is exploited in the construction of lasers.  Specifically, since electrons decay slowly from them, they can be deliberately piled up in this state without too much loss and then stimulated emission can be used to boost an optical signal.

See also
 Absorption (optics)
 Stimulated emission
 Emission spectrum
 Spectral line
 Atomic spectral line
 Laser science
 Purcell effect
 Photonic crystal
 Vacuum Rabi oscillation
 Jaynes–Cummings model

References

External links
 Detail calculation of the Spontaneous Emission: Weisskopf-Wigner Theory 
  Britney's Guide to Semiconductor Physics

Physical phenomena
Laser science
Electromagnetic radiation
Charge carriers